Chromatography software is software that collects and analyzes chromatographic results delivered by chromatography detectors.

Many chromatography software packages are provided by manufacturers, and many of them only provide a simple interface to acquire data. They also provide different tools to analyze this data.

The most common tool is "integration": It computes simple areas to delimit peaks by adding valleys automatically or not. Areas are computed between two valleys, a signal, and a baseline.

Applications are also available for simulation of chromatography, for example for teaching, demonstration, or for method development &/or optimization.

The following is a list of software and the (unexplained) tools that each provides:

See also 
 Laboratory informatics

References